Wolica  is a village in the administrative district of Gmina Kleszczów, within Bełchatów County, Łódź Voivodeship, in central Poland.

In 2005 the village had a population of 340.

References
 Gmina Kleszczów official website

Villages in Bełchatów County